Trichotoca is a genus of midges in the family Cecidomyiidae. There are two described species in this genus, both known only from Australia.

Species
Trichotoca edentula Jaschhof & Jaschhof, 2008
Trichotoca fraterna (Jaschhof 2000)

References

Cecidomyiidae genera
Insects described in 2008
Taxa named by Mathias Jaschhof
Taxa named by Catrin Jaschhof
Diptera of Australasia